Craig Clyde is an American actor, screenplay writer, and film director. He lives in Salt Lake City and is the father of K. C. Clyde. He is a member of the Church of Jesus Christ of Latter-day Saints.

Clyde is the cofounder of Majestic Entertainment Inc., a film production company based out of Utah. Currently Clyde and his son K.C. own Seerstone Entertainment.  They write and produce independent films.

Awards
Five-time winner of the International "Telly" award, documentary division
Grand Jury Award, Houston International Film Festival, America the Beautiful
The Golden Camera, Chicago Industrial Film Festival, America the Beautiful
Telly Award, America the Beautiful
Silver Award, Houston International Film Festival, Wind Dancer
Best Original Screenplay, Houston International Film Festival, Calico Jack
Best Original Screenplay, Santa Clarita International Children's Film Festival, Calico Jack
Gold Award (best theatrical film, small budget), Houston International Film Festival, Heaven Sent
Gold Award (original screenplay), Charleston International Film Festival, The Steps of Coronado
American Screenwriting Award Grand Prize (original screenplay), Nowhere Man

Filmography

Actor

 The Time Machine (1978)
 Beyond Death's Door (1979)
 Hangar 18 (1980)
 Earthbound (1981)
 The Adventures of Nellie Bly (1981)
 A Killer in the Family (1983)
 In Search of a Golden Sky (1984)
 Scorned and Swindled (1984)
 Konrad (1985)
 Evil in Clear River (1988)
 Mothers, Daughters and Lovers (1989)
 The Witching of Ben Wagner (1990)
 Tripwire (1990)
 Little Heroes (1992)
 In the Line of Duty: Siege at Marion (1992)
 Deliver Them from Evil: The Taking of Alta View (1992)
 Wind Dancer (1993)
 In the Shadow of Evil (1995)
 It Was Him or Us (1995)
 Terror in the Family (1996)
 Not in This Town (1997)
 Truth or Consequences, N.M. (1997)
 The Long Road Home (1999)
 Castle Rock (2000)
 Perfect Murder, Perfect Town (2000)
 I Saw Mommy Kissing Santa Claus (2002)
 Alikes (2002)
 Propensity (2006)
 Believe (2007)

Writer

 Blood Games (1990)
 China O'Brien II (1991)
 The Legend of Wolf Mountain (1992)
 Wind Dancer (1993)
 Heaven Sent (1994)
 Walking Thunder (1997)
 The Long Road Home (1999)
 A Dog's Tale (1999)
 Castle Rock (2000)
 No Place Like Home (2001)
 Miracle Dogs (2003)
 The Book of Mormon Movie, Vol. 1: The Journey (2003)
 The Adventures of Young Van Helsing: The Quest for the Lost Scepter (2004)
 The Family Holiday (2007)
 One Man's Treasure (2009)
 The Wild Stallion (2009)
 A Christmas Wish (2010)
 Storm Rider (2013)

Director

 Little Heroes (1992)
 The Legend of Wolf Mountain (1992)
 Wind Dancer (1993)
 Heaven Sent (1994)
 Walking Thunder (1997)
 The Long Road Home (1999)
 A Dog's Tale (1999)
 Castle Rock (2000)
 No Place Like Home (2001)
 Miracle Dogs (2003)
 The Derby Stallion (2005)
 The Family Holiday (2007)
 The Wild Stallion (2009)
 A Christmas Wish (2010)
 Storm Rider (2013)

References

External links 
 
 

Latter Day Saints from Utah
American film directors
Male actors from Salt Lake City
American male screenwriters
Living people
Writers from Salt Lake City
Screenwriters from Utah
Year of birth missing (living people)